Tsanak (Canaq) is a rural locality (a selo) in Arkitsky Selsoviet, Tabasaransky District, Republic of Dagestan, Russia. The population was 906 as of 2010.

Geography 
Tsanak is located 13 km east of Khuchni (the district's administrative centre) by road. Arkit is the nearest rural locality.

References 

Rural localities in Tabasaransky District